The Shooter is a 2013 Danish crime film directed by Annette K. Olesen.

Cast 
 Trine Dyrholm as Mia Moesgaard
 Kim Bodnia as Rasmus Holm Jensen
 Kristian Halken as Steffen Husfeldt
 Nikolaj Lie Kaas as Thomas Borby
 Lars Ranthe as Jesper Bang
  as Kriminalreporter
  as Fru Kamper
 Carsten Bjørnlund as Adam Larsen
  as Marianne
 Thue Ersted Rasmussen as Journalistelev
 Rhea Lehman as USA's udenrigsminister
 Bent Mejding as Steen Birger Brask
 Henrik Prip as Christian Løvschall
 Ida Dwinger as Fru Løvschall

References

External links 

2013 crime films
2013 films
2010s Danish-language films
Danish crime films